Ignazio Fabra (25 April 1930 – 13 April 2008) is a flyweight Greco-Roman wrestler from Italy. He won a world title in 1955 and finished second at the 1952 and 1956 Olympics and 1962 and 1963 world championships. He placed fourth-fifth at the 1960 and 1964 Olympics.

Fabra was deaf since birth and communicated by signs. He was winning the 1952 Olympic final against Boris Gurevich, but then misinterpreted a gesture of his coach, went into an attack, and got caught up in a counter-attack. After winning the 1955 world title he was a heavy favorite at the 1956 games, but lost in the final to Nikolay Solovyov due to a knee injury. Fabra retired in the late 1960s and became a wrestling coach. He led the national wrestling team at the 1969 World Games of the Deaf and prepared the 1972 Olympic medalist Giuseppe Bognanni.

Fabra was the first person to participate both at Olympic Games and Deaflympics. He has also won gold medals in 1961 and 1965 Deaflympics.

References

External links

1930 births
Olympic wrestlers of Italy
Wrestlers at the 1952 Summer Olympics
Wrestlers at the 1956 Summer Olympics
Wrestlers at the 1960 Summer Olympics
Wrestlers at the 1964 Summer Olympics
Italian male sport wrestlers
Olympic silver medalists for Italy
2008 deaths
Olympic medalists in wrestling
Deaf martial artists
Medalists at the 1956 Summer Olympics
Medalists at the 1952 Summer Olympics
Italian deaf people
20th-century Italian people
21st-century Italian people